Golaj is a village and a former municipality in the Kukës County, northeastern Albania. At the 2015 local government reform it became a subdivision of the municipality Has. The population at the 2011 census was 6,187. In the Ottoman Defter of 1571 for the Sanjak of Dukagjin, Golaj was part of the Nahiya of Pashtrik and was part of the timar of Hasan. The inhabitants of Golaj had a predominantly Christian Albanian anthroponomy with a degree of Islamisation: Mustafa Koka, Iljas Koka, Hasan Deja, Ali Deja, Memi Tusha, Ali Puta, Hasan Tola, Ahmed Benku, Papa Deja, Deda Papa, Tita (Dida) Gjeci, Prend Tita (Dida), Deda Kola, Benk Gika, Gjon Gjika, Mark Koka, Gjin Deja, Gjin Lika, Tola Koka, Gjon Lika, Gjin Andrea, Nina Gjoni, Papa Tola, Kola Bardi, Papa Nina, Papa Baci, Puta Gika, Bac Puta, Draga Progoni, Deja Lika, Gjon Lika, Draga Maza, Gjon Lika, Progon Gjura, Lika Progoni, Diraga Draga, Vata Gika, Kraga Gika, Gjon Vata, Biba Gaci, Mark Gaci, Gika Dida, Gjec Deda, Lika Kola. There were 35 Christian homes in total, and 8 Muslim household heads - all Albanian.

References

Former municipalities in Kukës County
Administrative units of Has (municipality)
Villages in Kukës County